Bunco Squad is a 1950 American crime film directed by Herbert I. Leeds and written by George Callahan. The film stars Robert Sterling, Joan Dixon, Ricardo Cortez, and Dante, and features Douglas Fowley and Elisabeth Risdon. The film was released on September 1, 1950 by RKO Pictures.

Cast 
Robert Sterling as Det. Sgt. Steve Johnson
Joan Dixon as Grace Bradshaw / Bride in film
Ricardo Cortez as Tony Weldon
Douglas Fowley as Det. Sgt. Mack McManus
Elisabeth Risdon as Jessica Royce
Marguerite Churchill as Barbara Madison
John Kellogg as Fred Reed
Bernadene Hayes as Princess Liane
Robert Bice as Drake 
Vivien Oakland as Annie Cobb
Harry August Jansen as Dante the Magician
Frank Wilcox as Dr. Largo (uncredited)

References

External links 
 

1950 films
American black-and-white films
1950s English-language films
RKO Pictures films
Films directed by Herbert I. Leeds
1950 crime films
Films scored by Paul Sawtell
American crime films
1950s American films